Gerbe's vole (Microtus gerbii) is a species of rodent in the family Cricetidae found in France and Spain.

References

Musser, G. G. and M. D. Carleton. 2005. Superfamily Muroidea. pp. 894–1531 in Mammal Species of the World a Taxonomic and Geographic Reference. D. E. Wilson and D. M. Reeder eds. Johns Hopkins University Press, Baltimore.

Microtus
Mammals described in 1879
Taxa named by Zéphirin Gerbe
Taxonomy articles created by Polbot
Taxobox binomials not recognized by IUCN